Equine herpesvirus is a group of viruses of the family Herpesviridae that infect horses.
Equine herpesvirus 1 of the subfamily Alphaherpesvirinae and genus Varicellovirus
Equine herpesvirus 2 of the subfamily Gammaherpesvirinae and genus Rhadinovirus
Equine herpesvirus 3 of the subfamily Alphaherpesvirinae and genus Varicellovirus
Equine herpesvirus 4 of the subfamily Alphaherpesvirinae and genus Varicellovirus
Equine herpesvirus 5 of the subfamily Gammaherpesvirinae and genus Rhadinovirus
Equine herpesvirus 6 of the subfamily Alphaherpesvirinae and genus Varicellovirus
Equine herpesvirus 7 of the subfamily Gammaherpesvirinae and genus Not assigned
Equine herpesvirus 8 of the subfamily Alphaherpesvirinae and genus Varicellovirus
Equine herpesvirus 9 of the subfamily Alphaherpesvirinae and genus Varicellovirus

Herpesvirus